The 2015–16 GlobalPort Batang Pier season was the fourth season of the franchise in the Philippine Basketball Association (PBA).

Key dates
August 23: The 2015 PBA draft took place in Midtown Atrium, Robinson Place Manila.

Draft picks

Roster

Philippine Cup

Eliminations

Standings

Playoffs

Bracket

Commissioner's Cup

Eliminations

Standings

Governors' Cup

Eliminations

Standings

Transactions

Trades 
Off-season

Recruited imports

References

NorthPort Batang Pier seasons
GlobalPort